Neuroxena postrubidus is a moth of the  subfamily Arctiinae. It is found in the Democratic Republic of Congo.

References

 Natural History Museum Lepidoptera generic names catalog

Nyctemerina
Endemic fauna of the Democratic Republic of the Congo